Hotel Ritz may refer to:

 The Ritz Hotel, London
 Hôtel Ritz Paris
 Hotel Ritz (Barcelona)
 Hotel Ritz (Buenos Aires) (:es:Hotel Ritz (Buenos Aires))
 Hotel Ritz (Cape Town)
 Hotel Ritz (Lisbon) 
 Ritz Hotel, Madrid
 Ritz-Carlton Montreal
 The Ritz-Carlton Hotel Company
 Ritz Hotel Hyderabad now known as Hill Fort Palace